The Florida Interurban Railway and Tunnel Company was incorporated in 1912 by the Bates Real Estate Interests and partners, which had extensive backgrounds in railroading with the Seaboard Air Line Railroad. It is not known if the company was a 'front' for Seaboard expansion into new markets but the use of a front company has been a common practice in Florida. The railway was to link Jacksonville with both St. Augustine and Pablo Beach (later named: Jacksonville Beach) with a 45-mile rail network. The tunnel would have had the additional bonus of being the first man-made crossing of the St. Johns River and was planned for interurbans and streetcars as well as automobiles and pedestrians. The opening of the St. Elmo Acosta toll Bridge in 1921 connected both sides of the river and it was used by streetcars, automobiles and pedestrians. Nothing more was heard from the FIR&T Company, but several more interurban schemes played into the area's electric railway history. Jacksonville Traction Company itself incorporated the Duval Traction Company which in 1918 completed a line from downtown Jacksonville to Camp Johnston (today's NAS JAX) near the Clay County line. The South Jacksonville municipal Railways flush with cash after linking Jacksonville and South Jacksonville extended its lines to both St. Nicholas and San Jose, which was then considered 'far out in the country.'

References

Florida railroads
Railway companies established in 1912
1912 establishments in Florida